Ross Mervyn Smith (21 April 1929 – 2 May 2002) was a New Zealand rugby union player. A wing three-quarter, Smith represented  at a provincial level, and was the first New Zealand player to score 100 first-class tries. He played just one match for the New Zealand national side, the All Blacks, a test against the touring Australian team in 1955.

References

1929 births
2002 deaths
Rugby union players from Ashburton, New Zealand
People educated at Timaru Boys' High School
New Zealand rugby union players
New Zealand international rugby union players
Canterbury rugby union players
Rugby union wings
New Zealand sports executives and administrators